The Indiana State Police is the statewide law enforcement agency for the U.S. state of Indiana. Indiana was the 12th state to offer protection to its citizens with a state police force.

Its headquarters are in the Indiana Government Center North in Indianapolis.

History

On July 15, 1921, the Indiana legislature, with approval from the governor, to appoint "all necessary deputies in addition to the present officers of the law" to enforce a newly enacted vehicle registration law. The secretary of state appointed a 16-man Indiana Motor Vehicle Police, becoming the first law enforcement agency in the state to have statewide jurisdiction to enforce traffic laws, although they had only "limited" authority and were only authorized to enforce the "rules of the road" and motor vehicle laws. On March 10, 1927, the Indiana legislature created a Bureau of Criminal Identification and Investigation, also under the secretary of state, for the purpose of installing and maintaining "local identification systems for the identification and prosecution of criminals and the investigation of crimes." In 1933, the Indiana State Police was formed largely consisting of basically untrained, ill-equipped traffic officers left over from the Motor Vehicle Police. The first formal "academy" began July 15, 1935, and consisted of between 80 and 100 candidates. It was not until 1976 that the academy graduated its first female troopers.

Indiana State Police Board
The Indiana State Police Board administers, manages, and controls the operation of the agency including the setting of salaries and compensation, with the approval of the governor and may review disciplinary action taken against a state police employee by the superintendent. The ISP board consists of six civilian members who are appointed by the governor and must be a permanent resident of one of six geographical regions of the state from which they are appointed. Members serve staggered, four-year terms and no more than three may belong to the same political party.

Organization
The Indiana State Police is currently led by Superintendent Douglas G. Carter, whose position is appointed by the governor. His command staff includes an assistant superintendent who holds the rank of colonel and four deputy superintendents, each holding the rank of lieutenant colonel who manage four primary areas of responsibility:
Financial Management includes the Fiscal Division and Logistics Division.
Support Services includes the Criminal Justice Data Division, Laboratory Division, Records Division and Public Information Office.
Investigations includes the Office of Professional Standards, Training Division and Criminal Investigation Division.
Enforcement includes the Commercial Vehicle Enforcement Division, Human Resources Division and Operations Support Division.
Enforcement operations throughout the state are the responsibility of a north zone and a south zone commander, which is further composed of five separate areas, each commanded by a captain. These areas are divided into 14 districts, covering from four to 11 counties each and are commanded by a lieutenant.

List of ISP superintendents

† Chief of the Indiana Motor Vehicle Police

Rank structure
The agency's rank structure is as follows (from highest to lowest):

Troopers with 10 and 15 years of service are referred to as a Senior Trooper and a Master Trooper respectively, resulting in salary increases, but are not considered ranks.

As of July 2015, the starting salary for a trooper is $40,902 upon completion of a one-year probation, while the salary for a colonel with 20 years of service is $90,781.

Equipment

Aircraft
In 1948, the Indiana State Police acquired a Navion airplane. Aircraft continued to be utilized throughout the 1950s and the Aviation Section continued to grow having helicopters introduced into the air fleet. Today, the Indiana State Police have two fixed-wing aircraft, three helicopters and six pilots used for law enforcement throughout the state which are maintained by the Aviation Section, a part of the Special Operations Section. The Indiana State Police also conduct joint operations with the Indiana National Guard to combat against illegal outdoor cannabis cultivation sites.

Service weapons
In 2006, around 50 Glock .40 S&W handguns issued to state troopers were identified as defective, impairing function. The handguns were replaced with the Glock 17 9mm, which functioned perfectly.

The Indiana State Police chose the SIGM400 rifle for its SWAT in 2012, and chose the SIG-Sauer P227 as its duty pistol, alongside the SIG-Sauer P365 as a backup pistol in 2014.

Troopers are issued the Remington 870 12 gauge Police Magnum shotgun.  Some troopers are issued AR-15 rifles, but most troopers who want a rifle are required to buy one themselves.

Vehicles

The Indiana State Police Fleet vehicle has been since 2011 the Dodge Charger Police Model. The rear wheel drive V8 Hemi Powered car was one of the last of its kind in 2011 after Ford discontinued the Crown Victoria. A total of 374 Horsepower assist ISP Troopers in tracking down violators and responding to emergency calls. 
For specialty units unable to utilize a Charger, the department has a mix of Chevy Tahoe PPVs and Dodge Ram 1500s. While the Tahoes were purchased largely pre 2014, there are several still in use by K9s and Commercial Vehicle Enforcement. The current specialty vehicle being purchased is the Dodge Ram which can be outfitted differently based on what the individual need is. The ISP employs fully marked, semi-marked and unmarked vehicles in their fleet.

Indiana State Police districts

Fallen officers

In the history of the Indiana State Police, 45 troopers and three civilian employees have died in the line of duty. The agency honors its personnel who have given the ultimate sacrifice at its own memorial consisting of an eternal flame and three granite tablets inscribed with their names at a site located on the east side of Indianapolis just off of Post Road at Interstate 70. Their troopers are also honored on the Indiana Law Enforcement and Fire Fighters Memorial located at Bicentennial Plaza and Senate Avenue in Indianapolis, which was dedicated in 2001 to the memory of the state's fallen public safety officers, as well as in Washington at the National Law Enforcement Officers Memorial, which honors the nation's law enforcement officers who have died in the line of duty and was dedicated in 1991.

Notes
 Trooper Teague was killed out-of-state in Paris, Edgar County, Illinois.	
 Trooper Minneman survived two days after his incident took place.	
 Trooper Dixon survived two days after his incident took place.	
 Trooper Mills survived eight years, 133 days after his incident took place.	
 Marshal James E. Larimer of the St. John, Indiana, Police Department was also killed in this incident.	
 A civilian employee who does not meet criteria for inclusion on the NLEOM.	
 Trooper Beal survived three days after his incident took place.	
 Deputy Chief Gary L. Martin of the Lake County, Indiana, Sheriff's Department was also killed in this incident.

Breathalyzer
The Indiana State Police was the first law enforcement agency in North America to have authorized the use of the famed "Drunk-o-meter", a chemical test to determine levels of alcohol intoxication, which was invented in 1938 by Rolla N. Harger, M.D., a professor at Indiana University. In 1954, an improved version of the device followed and was called the Breathalyzer, invented by Indiana State Police Captain Robert F. Borkenstein in collaboration with Dr. Harger. This successful device has since been used by police agencies to assess alcohol impairment in drunken driving offenses.

See also

 List of law enforcement agencies in Indiana
 Indiana State Police Pension Trust v. Chrysler LLC

Bibliography

References

External links
Indiana.gov 
Indiana State Police
Indiana Troopers Association
Indiana State Police Alliance

State law enforcement agencies of Indiana
Government agencies established in 1933
1933 establishments in Indiana
Cannabis eradication